Benjamin Almoneda (11 April 1930 – 6 January 2023) was a Filipino Roman Catholic prelate. He was auxiliary bishop of Daet  from 1990 to 1991 and then bishop from 1991 to 2007.

References

1930 births
2023 deaths
Filipino Roman Catholic bishops
20th-century Roman Catholic bishops in the Philippines
21st-century Roman Catholic bishops in the Philippines
Bishops appointed by Pope John Paul II
People from Camarines Norte